The Sporting Age is a 1928 drama film, directed by Erle C. Kenton. The film depicts the life of an wife neglected by her husband.

Plot
Miriam Driscoll doesn't think her husband, James Driscoll really loves her. After a train accident temporarily blinds James, Miriam has an affair with Phillip Kingston, her husband's male secretary. James regains his vision earlier than expected, and he realizes that his wife has cheated on him. He then asks his niece Nancy to steal Phillip from Miriam. The plan works, causing Miriam and James to get back together again.

Cast
 Belle Bennett as Miriam Driscoll
 Holmes Herbert as James Driscoll
 Carroll Nye as Phillip Kingston 
 Josephine Borio as Nancy Driscoll
 Edward Davis as The Doctor

References

External links

1928 films
American silent feature films
American drama films
1928 drama films
American black-and-white films
1920s American films
Silent American drama films